Noa is both a male and female first name as well as a surname.

In Israel, the name Noa is a popular name for girls. In the Hebrew Bible, Noa was one of the Five Daughters of Zelophehad.
In some languages, Noa is another form of Noah

People
 First name
 Noa (Achinoam Nini) (born 1969), Israeli singer
 Noa Denmon (born 1995 or 1996), American illustrator
 Noa James (born 1984), American rapper
 Noa Kirel (born 2001), Israeli singer and actress 
 Noa Lang (born 1999), Dutch football player
 Noa Lindberg, American actress
 Noa Nadruku (born 1967), ethnic Fijian rugby player
 Noa Nakaitaci (born 1990), Fiji-born French rugby player
 Noa Nayacakalou, Fijian rugby player
 Noa Palatchy (born 1994), Israeli rhythmic gymnast
 Noa Raviv (born 1987), Israeli fashion designer
 Noa Tishby (born 1977), Israeli actress
 Noa Kazado Yakar (born 2003), Israeli acrobatic gymnast
 Noa (Japanese singer), Japanese singer

 Surname
 , Japanese science fiction writer
 Ivana Noa (born 2003), Belgian actress
 Josef Noa (1856–1903), Hungarian chess master
 Juan Noa (died 1963), Manx dialect poet and playwright
 Kaulana Noa (born 1976), American football offensive guard
 Loveman Noa (1878–1901), US Naval officer killed during the Philippines Insurrection
 Manfred Noa (1893–1930), German film director
 Tavevele Noa (born 1992), Tuvaluan sprinter
 Thomas Lawrence Noa (1892–1977), American clergyman
 Yamilka Noa (born 1980), Cuban–Costa Rican poet and filmmaker

Fictional characters
 Noa Kean, a character from Code Black (TV series)
 Noa, a character from Fresh
 , a character from Kiba
 Noa (dog), a dog from Inubaka: Crazy for Dogs
 Noa Briqualon, a character from Star Wars
 , characters from the Gundam series
Noa Hollander, a character from the Israeli TV series Beauty and the Baker 
Noa Hamilton, a character from the American adaptation The Baker and the Beauty
 , a character from Patlabor
 , a character from Yu-Gi-Oh!
 , a character from Yamada-kun and the Seven Witches

Notes

Hebrew feminine given names
Japanese feminine given names